Toxicodendron calcicolum is a species of plant in the family Anacardiaceae. It is endemic to China.

References

calcicolum
Endemic flora of China
Endangered plants
Taxonomy articles created by Polbot
Taxobox binomials not recognized by IUCN